Stygnomma spiniferum is a species of armoured harvestman in the family Stygnommatidae. It is found in North America.

Subspecies
These three subspecies belong to the species Stygnomma spiniferum:
 Stygnomma spiniferum bolivari (Goodnight and Goodnight, 1945) i c g
 Stygnomma spiniferum spiniferum (Packard, 1888) i c g
 Stygnomma spiniferum tancahense Goodnight and Goodnight, 1951 i c g
Data sources: i = ITIS, c = Catalogue of Life, g = GBIF, b = Bugguide.net

References

Further reading

 

Harvestmen
Articles created by Qbugbot
Animals described in 1888